Moslem Niadoost (born 25 July 1990) is an Iranian middle-distance runner. He won a bronze medal in the 1500 metres at the 2017 Asian Championships.

International competitions

Personal bests
Outdoor
800 metres – 1:50.03 (Tehran 2013)
1500 metres – 3:46.41 (Wuhan 2015)
3000 metres steeplechase – 9:26.24 (Shiraz 2013)
Indoor
800 metres – 1:52.55 (Tehran 2017)
1500 metres – 1:51.90 (Tehran 2017)

References

1990 births
Living people
Iranian male middle-distance runners